The 2016 season is Bethlehem Steel FC's inaugural season of competitive soccer – its first season in the third division of American soccer and its first season in United Soccer League. Steel FC compete in the league's Eastern Conference.

Current roster

Transfers

In

Out

Loan in

Loan out

Competitions

Bethlehem Steel FC compete in USL, which is the third tier of the American soccer pyramid. Steel FC's affiliation with the Philadelphia Union of MLS has prevented the team from participating in the U.S. Open Cup competition. The decision to make affiliated "farm teams" ineligible for the U.S. Open Cup was decided for the 2016 iteration of the tournament.

Preseason

USL regular season 

The 2016 USL Season will be contested by 29 teams, 14 of which compete in the league's Eastern Conference. All teams will play a regular season total of 30 matches between teams within their respective conference. At the conclusion of the regular season, the top eight teams from each conference advance to the 2016 USL Playoffs for a chance to compete for the USL Championship Title.

Standings (Eastern Conference)

Results 

All times in Eastern Time.

Statistics 
As of September 25, 2016.

Goalkeepers 
As of September 25, 2016.

Players with names in italics were on loan from Philadelphia Union for individual matches with Bethlehem.
Players with names marked * were on loan from another club for the whole of their season with Bethlehem.
Players with names marked † were transferred from the club midseason.
League denotes USL regular season
Playoffs denotes USL Playoffs

Honors 
 Week 1 Team of the Week: D Ryan Richter
 Week 4 Team of the Week: M Eric Ayuk Honorable Mention: M Derrick Jones
 Week 6 Team of the Week: G John McCarthy
 Week 14 Team of the Week: Honorable Mention: G Samir Badr
 Week 16 Team of the Week: Honorable Mention: F Cory Burke
 Week 17 Team of the Week: M Derrick Jones
 Week 20 Team of the Week: Honorable Mention: D Ryan Richter

References 

Bethlehem Steel FC
Bethlehem Steel FC
Philadelphia Union II seasons
Bethlehem Steel FC